Trevor Quachri (born 1976) has been the sixth editor of Analog Science Fiction and Fact magazine since September 2012. He  started as an editorial assistant in 1999 at Asimov's Science Fiction and Analog. Previously, he was “a Broadway stagehand, collected data for museums, and executive produced a science fiction pilot for a basic cable channel.”  His predecessor-but-one at Analog, Ben Bova, was an early influence:  Bova’s Orion books were some of the first science fiction he read, followed by back issues of OMNI Magazine, and then Analog.    He lives in New Jersey, US, with his fiancée and daughter.

Bibliography

References

External links
 

1976 births
Living people
Analog Science Fiction and Fact people
Asimov's Science Fiction people
Science fiction editors